Diana Laura García Castillo (born 11 November 1999) is a Mexican footballer who plays as an attacking midfielder for Liga MX Femenil side Monterrey and the Mexico women's national team.

International career
García made her senior debut for Mexico on 5 March 2020 in a 1–1 friendly draw against Croatia.

International goals

References

External links 
 

1999 births
Living people
Women's association football midfielders
Mexican women's footballers
Footballers from San Luis Potosí
People from San Luis Potosí City
Mexico women's international footballers
Liga MX Femenil players
C.F. Pachuca (women) footballers
Club León (women) footballers
Mexican footballers